Marino Drake (born 18 June 1967 in Limonar, Matanzas) is a retired Cuban athlete competing in the high jump.  He currently works for North Carolina Central University as the jumps coach.

Achievements

1995 Central American and Caribbean Championships - gold medal
1990 Central American and Caribbean Games - silver medal

External links

1967 births
Living people
Cuban male high jumpers
Athletes (track and field) at the 1991 Pan American Games
Pan American Games competitors for Cuba
Athletes (track and field) at the 1992 Summer Olympics
Olympic athletes of Cuba
Central American and Caribbean Games silver medalists for Cuba
Competitors at the 1993 Central American and Caribbean Games
Central American and Caribbean Games medalists in athletics
People from Matanzas Province
20th-century Cuban people